Frente Democrático may refer to:

 Democratic Front of Chile
 Democratic Front (Peru)